Berala railway station is located on the Main South line, serving the Sydney suburb of Berala. It is served by Sydney Trains T3 Bankstown line services.

History
The original Berala station opened on 11 November 1912 when a line opened from Lidcombe to Regents Park. When it was decided to extend the line from Regents Park to Cabramatta as a branch of the Main South line, a deviation was built and a new Berala station opened on 6 December 1924. The NSW Government originally proposed the current alignment of the railway be without rail bridges over Vaughan St and Kerrs Road prompting a Lidcomobe Council led community backlash in the early 1920s.

An accessibility upgrade, including lift access to the station, was announced in 2015. As of August 2017 Berala Station is now wheelchair accessible by way of lift.

In February 2018, during a Cumberland City Council meeting Councillor Kun Huang cited historical NSW Government land subdivision posters outlining direct train services from Berala to Sydney (via Lidcombe) in the 1930s had a journey time of 22 minutes.

The NSW Government changes to train services have generally lack community support from Berala commuters, with resentment from the removal of direct services to City Circle and Liverpool via Regents Park in 2013 as well as opposition to the Sydney Metro Southwest project due to the removal of alternative route to City Circle via Bankstown and Sydenham.

Platforms & services
Historically Berala was served by services from the City Circle and Lidcombe operating to Bankstown and Liverpool on an alternate basis. This changed in the early 2000s, when most services to Liverpool were altered to operate via Bankstown. Today Berala is served by T3 Bankstown line services terminating at Lidcombe. With the terminus of services to Museum changed to Homebush on 20 October 2013, Platform 1 operates 2 daily City services via Strathfield and otherwise operates Lidcombe services.

Transport links
Transdev NSW operates one route via Berala station:
908: Bankstown station to Merrylands station

Berala station is served by one NightRide route:
N50: Liverpool station to Town Hall station

Accidents 

See Berala train collision, 1952

References

External links
Berala station details Transport for New South Wales

Railway stations in Sydney
Railway stations in Australia opened in 1912
Railway stations in Australia opened in 1924
Easy Access railway stations in Sydney
Main Southern railway line, New South Wales
Cumberland Council, New South Wales